Gianmaria "Gimmi" Bruni (born 30 May 1981) is an Italian Porsche factory auto racing driver who drove in the 2004 Formula One World Championship for Minardi. He is a GP2 Series race winner and is now racing in the FIA World Endurance Championship, in which he gained the 2013 and 2014 GT Drivers' Titles whilst driving as a factory Ferrari driver. He won the 2008 FIA GT Championship, 2011 Le Mans Series and 2012 International GT Open and took three class victories at the 24 Hours of Le Mans, in 2008, 2012 and 2014. He also was successful at the 2009 and 2015 24 Hours of Spa-Francorchamps, 2010 12 Hours of Sebring and 2011 Petit Le Mans.

Career

First wins in single-seaters 
Born in Rome, at age ten Bruni lied about his age to the director of La Pista d'Oro, a Go kart track in Italy, in order to begin an amateur Karting career (twelve was the minimum age to compete). His first experience with racing cars was in the Italian Formula Renault Campus in 1997; he won the Title in 1998. For the following season he moved on to the European Formula Renault Eurocup 2.0, taking another Title. Then he entered the British Formula 3, where he came fifth in 2000 and fourth in 2001. After he had raced in various similar European series like the Euro Formula 3000, finishing third in 2003, he caught the attention of Minardi.

Formula 1 

Bruni started testing for Minardi in 2003. However the biggest struggle of his career was finding enough sponsorship to compete for them in Formula 1 in 2004.

In fact Bruni did join Minardi for the 2004 Formula 1 season, though he struggled in a car which was considerably less developed than the rest of the grid. He was one of only two drivers to contest the majority of the season without scoring any points.

GP2 Series 
In 2005 Bruni competed in the GP2 Series, the single-seater Championship which is part of the Formula 1 support package and which is intended to be its feeder series. He won Race 1 at Barcelona and took second at Monaco driving for Coloni. The Italian left the Team in September before the Monza weekend. Joining up with Durango, he started on pole position at Spa-Francorchamps and finished tenth in the Drivers' Classification.

In 2006 Bruni competed again in the GP2 Series, this time with the new Trident Racing squad. He scored two victories, the first at Imola and the second at Hockenheim. At the end of the season he was seventh in the Drivers' Classification.

GT competitions 

For 2007, he switched to the sportscar racing as he joined the FIA GT Championship with Team AF Corse MOTOROLA in a Ferrari 430 GT3. He and his teammate Stéphane Ortelli finished the season 2nd in the GT2 class with 3 wins.

After competing in the American Le Mans Series for Risi Competizione, Bruni shifted focus to Europe for 2011, teaming with Giancarlo Fisichella in an AF Corse Ferrari F458 Italia, winning the driver's and team's championship in the LM GTE Pro class of the Le Mans Series and helping win the team's championship in the Intercontinental Le Mans Cup. Bruni finished 2nd at the Le Mans 24hrs and won the Petit Le Mans.

At the 2012 12 Hours of Sebring, Bruni disqualified his car by attempting to shunt off the BMW M3 GT of Joey Hand on the last lap to help the sister car of Olivier Beretta to win the overall grand touring classification, though the BMW was in a different class and the car would not have classified anyway because it did not make 70% of the race leader's distance.

In the 80th edition of the 24 Hours of Le Mans in 2012, Bruni and the AF Corse Team scored first place in the GTE-Pro class along with his co-drivers Toni Vilander and Giancarlo Fisichella; their Ferrari 458 Italia covered a total of 336 laps (2,845.53 miles) of the Circuit de la Sarthe.

Bruni scored three wins and two second places at the 2013 FIA World Endurance Championship, so he won the GTE-Pro teams trophy and the GTE drivers and manufacturers cups.

In February 2017, Ferrari and Gianmaria Bruni announce that, by mutual consent, they have early terminated their relationship.
After a collaboration started in 2007, Bruni will leave Ferrari at the end of June of this year.
Bruni signed a contract with Porsche Motorsport.

As a result of the contract termination settlement he sat out the first half of the 2017 racing season, making his Porsche debut in July at Watkins Glen. In 2018 he will race for Porsche in the WEC replacing Frédéric Makowiecki

Racing record

Complete Formula One results
(key) (Races in bold indicate pole position; races in italics indicate fastest lap)

† Did not finish the race, but was classified as he had completed more than 90% of the race distance.

Complete GP2 Series results
(key) (Races in bold indicate pole position) (Races in italics indicate fastest lap)

Complete European Le Mans Series results
(key) (Races in bold indicate pole position; races in italics indicate fastest lap)

Complete 24 Hours of Le Mans results

Complete FIA World Endurance Championship results
(key) (Races in bold indicate pole position; races in
italics indicate fastest lap)

Complete IMSA SportsCar Championship results
(key) (Races in bold indicate pole position) (Races in italics indicate fastest lap)

References

External links
Official website (Italian)

1981 births
Living people
Italian racing drivers
Italian Formula One drivers
GP2 Series drivers
FIA GT Championship drivers
Auto GP drivers
British Formula Three Championship drivers
Minardi Formula One drivers
24 Hours of Le Mans drivers
American Le Mans Series drivers
European Le Mans Series drivers
French F4 Championship drivers
24 Hours of Daytona drivers
Rolex Sports Car Series drivers
FIA World Endurance Championship drivers
International GT Open drivers
WeatherTech SportsCar Championship drivers
24 Hours of Spa drivers
Racing drivers from Rome
Blancpain Endurance Series drivers
Trident Racing drivers
Porsche Motorsports drivers
Scuderia Coloni drivers
Durango drivers
AF Corse drivers
SMP Racing drivers
Fortec Motorsport drivers